The following highways are numbered 831:

United States